Jack Butterfill (born 12 September 2003) is an English professional footballer who plays as a forward for  club Barnsley.

Career
Butterfill came through the Leicester City Academy and joined Barnsley in the summer of 2022. He scored on his first-team debut on 20 September 2022, coming on for Fabio Jalo as a substitute 70 minutes into a 2–0 win over Newcastle United U21 in an EFL Trophy group stage game at Oakwell. He said that "it's my biggest moment. It was in front of a crowd as well, it was great".

Career statistics

References

2003 births
Living people
English footballers
Association football forwards
Leicester City F.C. players
Barnsley F.C. players
English Football League players